Robert Wilkinson (February 8, 1888 – January 4, 1967) was a Canadian politician. He served in the Legislative Assembly of British Columbia from 1933 to 1937  from the electoral district of Vancouver-Point Grey, a member of the Liberal party.

References

1888 births
1967 deaths